Ian Daniell (born 7 October 1956) is a South African cricketer. He played in 43 first-class and 29 List A matches for Eastern Province from 1977/78 to 1986/87.

See also
 List of Eastern Province representative cricketers

References

External links
 

1956 births
Living people
South African cricketers
Eastern Province cricketers
Cricketers from Port Elizabeth